Zidani Most is a small settlement on the Temenica River east of Trebnje in the historical region of Lower Carniola in Slovenia. The municipality is now included in the Southeast Slovenia Statistical Region.

References

External links

Zidani Most at Geopedia

Populated places in the Municipality of Trebnje